Norman Raymond Jacobson (31 October 1917 – 13 January 1994) was an Australian rugby league footballer who played in the 1940s. A New South Wales representative three-quarter back, he played his club football career in the NSWRFL Premiership for the Newtown club.

A  and prolific try-scorer, Jacobson played in Newtown's grand final win in 1943. After returning from interstate Army service, he resumed playing for Newtown the following year and played in the 1944 grand final loss. In his final season at Newtown, Jacobson was the League's top try-scorer, with 27 tries from 19 appearances. 
Jacobsen was selected to captain Western Districts when they hosted the 1951 French touring side and lost. After retiring from playing football, he coached Condobolin's rugby league side.

References

External links
Norm Jacobson at stats.rleague.com
Norm Jacobson at rugbyleagueproject.org

 

1917 births
1994 deaths
Australian rugby league coaches
Australian rugby league players
Newtown Jets players
New South Wales rugby league team players
City New South Wales rugby league team players
Country New South Wales rugby league team players
Rugby league centres
Rugby league players from Parramatta
Rugby league wingers